Hamzeh Deh-e Olya (also Romanized as Ḩamzeh Deh-e ‘Olyā; also known as Ḩamzeh Deh-e Bālā) is a village in Baladeh Kojur Rural District, in the Central District of Nowshahr County, Mazandaran Province, Iran. At the 2006 census, its population was 593, in 135 families.

References 

Populated places in Nowshahr County